Scream is an internationally distributed British horror film fan magazine which has been in publication since 2010. Published bi-monthly and featuring articles and photos about films, books, games, comics, graphic novels, and more, along with celebrity interviews and on-location film reports, the magazine claims to be "the world's number one print horror magazine".

Publication
The first issue of Scream was published in October 2010, featuring a cover story on the Joe Johnston film The Wolfman. In 2014, Scream magazine launched iScream, which allows consumers to purchase issues of the magazine digitally. On 19 September 2016 the magazine became available at Barnes & Noble stores in the United States. Beyond its digital availability or its availability through a subscription, issues of the magazine are carried by Barnes & Noble and Books-A-Million in the United States, Chapters in Canada, Eason & Son in Ireland, and WHSmith in the United Kingdom.

See also 
 Famous Monsters of Filmland
 Fangoria
 Rue Morgue (magazine)

References

External links
 
 Scream on Facebook
 Scream on Twitter

Magazines established in 2010
Film magazines published in the United Kingdom
Monthly magazines published in the United Kingdom
Speculative fiction magazines published in the United Kingdom
Horror fiction websites